Demetrius of Amphipolis (Greek: Δημήτριος ὁ Ἀμφιπολίτης; fl. 4th century BC) was one of Plato's students. He is perhaps identical with the person mentioned in Plato's Testament as one of the executors of his last will.

References
Diogenes Laërtius, Life of Plato. Translated by C.D. Yonge.

Academic philosophers
Ancient Amphipolitans
4th-century BC Greek people
4th-century BC philosophers
Metic philosophers in Classical Athens
Philosophers of ancient Macedonia